Portugal was represented by Simone de Oliveira, with the song "Sol de inverno", at the 1965 Eurovision Song Contest, which took place on 20 March in Naples. "Sol de inverno" was chosen as the Portuguese entry at the Grande Prémio TV da Canção Portuguesa on 6 February.

Before Eurovision

Festival da Canção 1965
The Grande Prémio TV da Canção Portuguesa 1965 was held on 6 February 1965 at 21:55 UTC at the Lumiar studios of the Radio and Television of Portugal in Lisbon, hosted by Henrique Mendes. Eight songs took part in the final. Fernando de Carvalho conducted all the songs. The winning song was chosen by a distrital jury, composed by three members, each had 5 votes to be distributed among the songs it intended to award, making a total of 15 votes per district.

At Eurovision 
On the night of the final Oliveira performed 12th in the running order, following France and preceding Italy. Each national jury awarded 5-3-1 to their top three songs, and at the close "Sol de inverno" had picked up only 1 point (from Monaco), placing Portugal joint 13th (with Norway) of the 18 entries. The Portuguese jury awarded its 5 points to Austria. The orchestra during the Portuguese entry was conducted by Fernando de Carvalho.

Voting

References 

1965
Countries in the Eurovision Song Contest 1965
Eurovision